Sindagi is a City and Taluk in Vijayapura district in the Indian state of Karnataka, about 60 km to the east of Bijapur.

Geography
It has an average elevation of 500 metres (1640 feet). Sindagi is 60 km/37.28 miles away from the main district city of Bijapur, and 545 km/338.95 miles from the state capital, Bangalore. The nearest major railway station to Sindagi is at Indi (50 km), and the nearest airport is at Kalaburagi (96 km). Sindagi is a lesser Rainy Area and Most of the Area is Dry land.
And Sindagi has a Good Planned City in Vijaypura District . Sindagi is Having Good Transportation System With National Highway 50.

Demographics
 India census, Sindagi had a population of 53,213. Males constitute 51% of the population and females 49%. Sindagi has a middle range literacy rate of 61%. Male literacy is 69%, and female literacy is 55%. 16% of the population is under 6 years. Sindagi City is the best commercial taluk In Vijaypura District.and one of the taluk eligible of being a new district also.

Sindagi Religion Data 2011 

The population of Sindagi town was 37,226, as per the 2011 census by government of India. Hindus constitute 69.26% of the population, while Muslims closely follow with 30.12%.

See also
 Bijapur
 Muddebihal
 Basavana Bagewadi
 Kalaburagi
 Indi
 Bagalkot

References

Cities and towns in Bijapur district, Karnataka